The Game of Life is an American television series on The Hub (now Discovery Family). The program, hosted by Frank Nicotero, is based on the Milton Bradley board game The Game of Life. It ran from September 3, 2011, to April 15, 2012.

Gameplay
Two families of three compete for the chance to win the grand prize.

Round 1
Each team takes a turn "driving" the Game of Life car through a Life adventure of their choice. (The car actually faces a green screen animation, and can be shaken in various ways to simulate turns, bumps, and jumps in the "road".) After choosing one of the two adventures, the team faces a series of 50/50 questions at the forks in the road. The driver turns the wheel toward the fork they feel is the correct answer. Drivers sometimes incorrectly turn towards the answer they did not mean to choose. Correct answers earn "Life points", while wrong answers stop the car for 5 seconds.

Correct answers earn 100 Life points on the first question, then 100 Added for each of the next correct answers. The adventure continues until the car runs "out of gas" (time, about two minutes).

Round 2
Play remains the same as Round 1, usually with the second team going first. Life points are doubled in this round (200, 400, 600, etc.). In addition, one question(the second or third) of the adventure can earn extra gas for the car in addition to its life point value, allowing the chance to answer more questions and possibly earn more Life points, and whoever had the most life points get to spin a bonus prize.

Bonus Spin
The team with the highest score after Round 2 gets to spin a giant version of the Game of Life Spinner for a special bonus prize. If they can successfully predict whether the spinner will land on an odd or even number, they win the bonus prize. A consolation prize is awarded for a wrong guess. In the event of a tie, one team takes the odd numbers, while the other team takes the even numbers, and host Nicotero spins the spinner. The team that wins the spin receives the bonus prize; the other team receives the consolation prize.

Round 3
Both teams compete simultaneously in a 60-second stunt. Each time the task in the stunt is completed successfully, 250 or 500 Life points are awarded to the teams.  The teams sometimes wear special 'The Game of Life' T-shirts, one team wore red and the other team wore blue.

The team with the highest total score at the end of this round wins and advances to the Grand Prize Round while the losing team receives a consolation prize that was never announced on screen, which was announced backstage. If both teams are tied with the same score at the end of round 3, the Bonus Spin is played again.

Grand Prize Round
The round takes place in two parts. In the first part, each member of the winning family was asked a "would you rather"-style question during the commercial break based on one of the three adventures they played during the show. The other two family members must predict which answer was given. Each right answer earns an extra number on the Game of Life Spinner.

The team now faces the Game of Life Spinner one more time. The team again chooses between the odds and evens, plus any extra numbers of their choice that they earned. If the Spinner lands on any of the numbers that were chosen, the team wins the grand prize of a family vacation (except for the premiere, which had a 3-D family screening room). A consolation prize is again awarded for a wrong guess.

References

2011 American television series debuts
2012 American television series endings
2010s American game shows
English-language television shows
Television shows based on board games
Television series by Hasbro Studios
Television shows based on Hasbro toys